Sir Malik Feroz Khan Noon,  ( 7 May 18939 December 1970), best known as Feroze Khan, was a Pakistani politician who served as the seventh prime minister of Pakistan from 1957 until being removed when President Iskandar Ali Mirza imposed martial law with the 1958 Pakistani coup d'état.

Trained as a barrister in England, Noon served as High Commissioner of India to the United Kingdom before serving as a military adviser, over issues pertaining to the British Indian Army, to Prime Minister Winston Churchill's war ministry from the India Office.

Noon was one of the Founding Fathers of Pakistan who helped to negotiate and establish the Federation of Pakistan as a nation state on 14 August 1947, resulting from the successful constitutional movement led by Muhammad Ali Jinnah.

Early life and education in England

Feroz Khan Noon was born in the village of Hamoka, located in Khushab District, Punjab in the then British India on 7 May 1893. He came from an aristocratic landowning family that were known for their wealth and reputation in social circles and belonged to the Punjabi Jat family of Noon clan.

After his initial schooling, Noon attended Aitchison College in Lahore before being sent to England in 1912. The India Office arranged for him to stay with the family of a Reverend Lloyd in Ticknall, South Derbyshire. From there he applied to study at Oxford University, initially being rejected by Balliol College, he was then accepted by Wadham College. Noon stayed with Lloyd's family until 1913, and had a close relationship with them until going to Oxford.

At Wadham College, Noon studied history and Farsi, graduating with a Bachelor of Arts (BA) degree in history in 1916. He was a keen soccer player and played collegiate field hockey for Isis Club.

During his college years, Noon went to the United States in search of higher education at universities there but returned to Oxford. He interacted with very few Indian students while at university, heeding his father's advice to learn English culture, and lacked time to attend any Indian cultural festivals because he was concentrating on his studies.

In 1916, Noon moved to London to sit the law examination. He qualified as a barrister-at-law from the Inner Temple in 1917 before returning to India.

Political career

Law practice and legislative career in India

After returning to India in September 1917, Noon began practising law at the District Court in Sargodha and later moved to the Lahore High Court, establishing his reputation in civil law until 1927.

In 1920–21, Noon entered national politics and was elected to the Punjab Legislative Assembly on the platform of the Unionist Party. During this time, he formed a close acquaintance with Jogendra Singh. From 1927 until 1931, he joined the cabinet of the Governor of Punjab, Malcolm Hailey and held the portfolio of provincial Ministry of Local Government until 1930.

Between 1931 and 1936, Noon was in the cabinets of Governors Geoffrey Fitzhervey de Montmorency, Sir Sikandar Hyat, and Herbert William Emerson where he held provincial portfolios of Ministries of Health and Education.

In December 1932, Noon was appointed as an Officer of the Venerable Order of Saint John. In 1933, Noon was knighted in the 1933 New Year Honours List. He was appointed as Knight Commander of the Order of the Indian Empire (KCIE) in the 1937 Coronation Honours List and appointed as Knight Commander of the Order of the Star of India (KCSI) in October 1941.

Diplomatic career: World War II and Pakistan Movement

In 1936, Noon resigned from his public service in Punjab when he was appointed as the High Commissioner of India to the United Kingdom.

Over the issue of the Immigration Act of 1924 in the United States, the British Government directed Noon to Washington D.C. He was accompanied by Nevile Butler of the Foreign and Commonwealth Office in 1941 to address issues of American exploration in Baluchistan, and the Most Favoured Nation (MFN) status between the United States and the United Kingdom, in light of the Anglo-American Trade Agreement signed in 1938. Noon showed great reluctance to grant American petroleum companies access to Baluchistan due to the Indian government's difficulty maintaining control in remote areas adjacent to Iran and Afghanistan, especially when Indians were being barred from entering the United States.

After the start of World War II in 1939, Noon, who had pro-British views, supported British efforts against the Axis powers, lobbying for deployment of the British Indian Army in Africa and the Middle East. In 1940, he strongly supported Egyptian plans to establish the grand mosque in London. During the height of the anti-British Quit India Movement in India, Noon played a crucial role by convincing Prime Minister Churchill of the support of Indian Muslims for continued British control there.

In 1941, Noon left his diplomatic post when he was asked to join the Churchill cabinet, being appointed first as his military adviser from the Secretary of State for India of India Office on the affairs of the Indian Army. Khan later joined the Viceroy's Executive Council's cabinet as a labour minister, and played a crucial role in advising against the Independence of India, without addressing the push of Muhammad Ali Jinnah and other leaders for the Muslim question.

In 1944–45, Churchill appointed Noon to the War Department, leading his own department alongside Sir Arcot Ramasamy Mudaliar that provided representation for British India in the Pacific War Council. In 1945, he was appointed as Permanent Representative of India to the United Nations, attending the first UN session in San Francisco, California.

In 1946, Noon joined the Muslim League, led by Jinnah. He merged his faction of the Unionist Party into the Muslim League and garnered public support for the cause of Pakistan amidst opposition from Khizar Hayat Tiwana, who wanted to remain as Premier of the Indian Punjab.

During the 1945 Indian general election, Noon's merging of the Unionist Party into the Muslim League played a decisive role. The Muslim League won by a landslide in the Punjab.

Public service in Pakistan

Governorship of East Bengal and Chief Minister of Punjab

In 1947, Noon retained his constituency and became a Member of the National Assembly of Pakistan (MNA) of the Constituent Assembly of Pakistan, following the establishment of Pakistan as a result of the Partition of India.

In October 1947, Jinnah, now Governor-General of Pakistan, appointed Noon as a special envoy and dispatched him to Saudi Arabia and the Islamic world to introduce Pakistan and explain the reasons for its creation, to familiarize the Muslim countries with its internal problems, and to get moral and financial support from the brother countries. Noon performed the role assigned to him in a successful manner.

In 1950, Prime Minister Liaquat Ali Khan removed Feroz Noon from the Foreign Ministry, appointing him as the Governor of East Bengal. However, he was less interested in the politics of East Bengal and focused towards the provincial politics of Punjab in Pakistan, contesting with Mumtaz Daultana for the post of Chief Minister. He had little interest in strengthening the political program of the Muslim League in Bengal and offered no political action when the popular Bengali Language Movement took place in 1950–51. On 25 July 1952, he returned to Punjab in Pakistan and left the post to Abdur Rahman Siddiqui, returning to his post on 10  November 1952.  Noon left Dhaka to become the Chief Minister of Punjab on 26 March 1953.

After the 1953 religious riots in Lahore that resulted in Daultana's resignation, Noon finally achieved his goal when he convinced Prime Minister Khawaja Nazimuddin to appoint him as the third Chief Minister of Punjab.

Foreign ministry in coalition administration

In 1955, Noon parted from the Muslim League when he helped to establish the Republican Party, supporting the cause of the One Unit programme that laid establishment of West and East wings of Pakistan. He took over the presidency of the Republican Party, and joined the coalition of the three-party government composed of, the Awami League, the Muslim League, and the Republican Party that endorsed Iskander Mirza for the presidency. Noon had been ideologically very close to Mirza and was appointed in the coalition cabinet of Prime Minister Huseyn Suhrawardy.

In 1956–57, Noon attempted to hold talks with India over the Kashmir issue, and insurgency in Eastern India, but was unable to make any breakthrough.

Prime Minister of Pakistan (1957–58)

After the resignations of the Awami League's H.S. Suhrawardy and the Muslim League's I. I. Chundrigar, Noon was the last candidate from the three-party coalition government, and started his support for the premiership on a conservative-Republican Party agenda.

Noon successfully forged an alliance with the Awami League, the National Awami Party, the Krishak Sramik Party, and the parliamentary groups in the National Assembly that allowed him to form the government as its Prime Minister.

Negotiation for Gwadar

On 16 December 1957, Noon took an oath from Chief Justice M. Munir and formed a coalition government.

Noon's ability to get Gwadar into the Federation, and settlement of political issues in the country generally, threatened President Mirza who saw him as an obstacle to Mirza obtaining absolute power. Noon tried to obtain a compromise with India regarding the Kashmir problem.

In his memoirs, "From Memory", Noon writes, "With Gwadar in foreign hands, I had felt we were living in a house in which the back room with another door, was occupied by a stranger who could, at any time, sell us out to a power inimical to Pakistan…". The wife of Feroz Khan Noon, Viqar-un-Nisa Noon, also played a large role in the accession of Gwadar to Pakistan. She visited London in 1956 to see the British Prime Minister Winston Churchill, and to lobby the British Parliament for their protectorate of Muscat and Oman to give custody of 'Gwadar Port' to Pakistan, and get approval from the House of Lords.

Noon had not endorsed the presidential re-election of Mirza as the three-party coalition had been negotiating their own president to replace Mirza in 1958. At midnight on 7/8 October 1958, Mirza imposed martial law in a coup d'état against his own party's government, effectively dismissing his own appointed Prime Minister to usurp all political power into his own hands.

Later and personal life, and death

After the 1958 Pakistani coup d'état, Noon retired from national politics and became a political writer. He authored five books on the history of India and issues pertaining to law and politics in Pakistan.

Wisdom From Fools (1940), short stories for children.
Scented Dust (1941), a novel.
India (1941)
Kashmir (1957)
 From Memory (1966)

Noon was married to Viqar-un-Nisa Noon, an Austrian, who was a prominent politician and a social worker by profession. He died on 9 December 1970 in his ancestral village of Nurpur Noon, Sargodha District, where he is buried.

See also

Politics of Pakistan
Anglo-Indians
India in World War II
Gwadar

References

External links

 
 Chronicles Of Pakistan

|-

|-

|-

|-

1893 births
1970 deaths
Feroz
People from Sargodha
People from Khushab District
Prime Ministers of Pakistan
Foreign Ministers of Pakistan
Defence Ministers of Pakistan
Governors of East Pakistan
High Commissioners of India to the United Kingdom
Permanent Representatives of India to the United Nations
Leaders of the Pakistan Movement
Pakistani MNAs 1947–1954
Pakistani barristers
Pakistani diplomats
Pakistan Muslim League politicians
Chief Ministers of Punjab, Pakistan
Pakistani MNAs 1955–1958
Punjab, Pakistan MLAs 1947–1949
Punjab, Pakistan MLAs 1951–1955
Leaders ousted by a coup
Indian barristers
Indian knights
Punjabi people
Pakistani Muslims
Pakistani republicans
Pakistani memoirists
Pakistani autobiographers
Pakistani political writers
Historians of India
Indian people of World War II
Aitchison College alumni
Alumni of Wadham College, Oxford
Knights Commander of the Order of the Indian Empire
Knights Commander of the Order of the Star of India
20th-century memoirists
20th-century Pakistani male writers
Members of the Constituent Assembly of Pakistan